Albaconazole (development code UR-9825) is an experimental triazole antifungal. It has potential broad-spectrum activity. The drug blocks a number of CYP450 liver enzymes.

It has also been studied as an antiprotozoal agent.

References 

Chloroarenes
Fluoroarenes
Lactams
Lanosterol 14α-demethylase inhibitors
Phenylethanolamines
Quinazolines
Tertiary alcohols
Triazole antifungals